Bard-e Pahn Abdol Latif (also Romanized as Bard-e Pahn ʿAbdol Laṭīf; also known as Bard-e Pahn, Bard Pahnī, and Sang-e Pahn) is a village in Sepidar Rural District, in the Central District of Boyer-Ahmad County, Kohgiluyeh and Boyer-Ahmad Province, Iran. At the 2006 census, its population was 49, in 8 families, 6.1 people per family.

References 

Populated places in Boyer-Ahmad County